Kielce is a Polish parliamentary constituency that is coterminous with the Świętokrzyskie Voivodeship.  It elects sixteen members of the Sejm.

The district has the number '33' for elections to the Sejm and is named after the city of Kielce.  It includes the counties of Kielce, Ostrowiec, Starachowice, Jędrzejów, Końskie, Sandomierz, Skarżysko, Staszów, Busko, Opatów, Włoszczowa, Pińczów, and Kazimierza and the city county of Kielce.

List of members

Sejm

Footnotes

Electoral districts of Poland
Kielce
Świętokrzyskie Voivodeship